This list of fossil fish research presented in 2021 is a list of new taxa of jawless vertebrates, placoderms, acanthodians, fossil cartilaginous fishes, bony fishes, and other fishes that were described during the year, as well as other significant discoveries and events related to paleoichthyology that occurred in 2021.

Jawless vertebrates

Jawless fishes research
 A study on the phylogenetic relationships of cyathaspidids is published by Elliott, Lassiter & Blieck (2021).
 Miyashita et al. (2021) report larval and juvenile forms of four stem lampreys from the Paleozoic era (Hardistiella, Mayomyzon, Pipiscius and Priscomyzon), including a hatchling-to-adult growth series of Priscomyzon, and report that the studied larvae display features that are otherwise unique to adult modern lampreys, and lack the defining traits of ammocoetes.
 A study on the anatomy and likely feeding ecology of Mesomyzon mengae, based on data from new, well-preserved specimens, is published by Wu, Chang & Janvier (2021).
 A study on the histology of the dermal skeleton in Procephalaspis oeselensis, Aestiaspis viitaensis, Dartmuthia gemmifera and four species of Tremataspis is published by Bremer et al. (2021), who interpret their findings as indicative of the emergence of the complex pore-canal system in Tremataspis through the modification of the structures already present in other taxa.
 A study aiming to determine whether the earliest vertebrates may have swum under various conditions without a clearly-differentiated tail fin, based on data from an abstracted model of Metaspriggina walcotti, is published by Rival, Yang & Caron (2021).
 A study on the morphological and functional diversity of osteostracan and galeaspid headshields, and on its implications for the knowledge of the ecology of the immediate jawless relatives of jawed vertebrates, is published by Ferrón et al. (2021).
 Redescription of Nochelaspis maeandrine is published by Meng, Zhu & Gai (2021).
 A study on the anatomy of a dorsal head shield of Kalanaspis delectabilis is published by Tinn et al. (2021).

Placoderms

Placoderm research
 Zhu et al. (2021) use CT scanning to reveal the endocast of Brindabellaspis stensioi, and evaluate the implications of its anatomy for the knowledge of the phylogenetic relationships of early jawed vertebrates.
 Redescription of the anatomy of the headshield of Parayunnanolepis xitunensis is published by Wang & Zhu (2021).
 Description of new fossil material of Palaeacanthaspis vasta from the Devonian (Lochkovian) Chortkiv Formation (Ukraine), and a study on the phylogenetic relationships of this species, is published by Dupret et al. (2021).

Acanthodians

Acanthodian research 
 A study on the development of teeth in acanthodians, and on its implications for the knowledge of the evolution of teeth of jawed vertebrates, is published by Rücklin et al. (2021).
 A study on the anatomy of teeth, jaws and associated oral structures of acanthodians, and on their implications for the knowledge of the evolution of dentition of modern cartilaginous fishes, is published by Dearden & Giles (2021).

Cartilaginous fishes

Cartilaginous fish research
 Description of new fossil material of Gualepis elegans from the Lower Devonian of Yunnan (China), and a study on the phylogenetic relationships of this fish, is published by Cui et al. (2021).
 Mottequin et al. (2021) reject the interpretation of Spiraxis interstrialis as chondrichthyan egg cases, and evaluate the implications of this reinterpretation for the knowledge of the evolution of oviparity in cartilaginous fishes.
 Description of the first known skull remains of Onchopristis numidus from the Cretaceous Kem Kem Group (Morocco), and a study on the anatomy and phylogenetic relationships of this species, is published by Villalobos-Segura et al. (2021), who name a new family Onchopristidae.
 New, exceptionally well-preserved skeleton of Asteracanthus ornatissimus, preserved with teeth that markedly differ from other teeth referred to Asteracanthus, is described from the Tithonian Altmühltal Formation (Germany) by Stumpf et al. (2021), who interpret this specimen as indicating that Asteracanthus and Strophodus represent two valid genera distinct from all other hybodontiforms.
 A study on the morphological diversity of teeth of lamniform sharks from mid-Cretaceous assemblages in Australia, and on its implications for the knowledge of the composition of mid-Cretaceous shark communities and their recovery in the aftermath of the Cenomanian-Turonian boundary event, is published by Bazzi, Kear & Siversson (2021).
 A study on the biomechanics of teeth of five species of Otodus, aiming to assess the functional significance of morphological trends in otodontid teeth and to test whether the morphology of otodontid teeth enabled the transition from piscivory to predation on marine mammals and the evolution of titanic body sizes, is published by Ballell & Ferrón (2021)
 A study on a bonebed in the Oligocene Chandler Bridge Formation (South Carolina, United States) with a large sample of Carcharocles angustidens dominated by small teeth is published by Miller, Gibson & Boessenecker (2021), who interpret this bonebed as a nursery area for C. angustidens.
 A study on growth patterns, reproductive biology and likely lifespan of Otodus megalodon is published by Shimada et al. (2021).
 Perez, Leder & Badaut (2021) present a novel method for estimating body size in fossil lamniform sharks, and attempt to determine the body size of Otodus megalodon.
 Revision of the fossil record of the extant tiger shark and the extinct members of the tiger shark lineage is published by Türtscher et al. (2021).
 Redescription of Striatolamia tchelkarnurensis is published by Malyshkina (2021).
 Shark teeth which might represent the first occurrence of the blacknose shark in the Pacific Ocean are described from the Pliocene Upper Onzole Formation (Ecuador) by Collareta et al. (2021), who evaluate the implications of this finding for the knowledge of the evolutionary history of the blacknose shark and the whitenose shark.
 Two fossil teeth of the blacktip shark are reported from lower Pliocene marine deposits of Tuscany (Italy) by Collareta et al. (2021), representing the first known occurrence of this species in the fossil record from both Europe and the Mediterranean Basin.
 A study on the morphological diversity of extant and fossil shark teeth, and on their implications for the knowledge of the evolution of lamniform and carcharhiniform sharks throughout the last 83 million years, is published by Bazzi et al. (2021).
 A study on the evolutionary history of sharks across the Cretaceous–Paleogene extinction event, as indicated by morphological diversity of shark teeth across the Cretaceous–Paleogene interval, is published by Bazzi et al. (2021).
 Evidence of a previously unknown major extinction of sharks in the early Miocene, ~19 million years ago, is presented by Sibert & Rubin (2021); the study is subsequently criticized by Naylor et al. (2021) and Feichtinger et al. (2021).
 A study on shark scales from mid-Holocene (~7,000-y-old) and modern reef sediments in Bocas del Toro (Panama), aiming to determine changes of shark abundance in this area since the mid-Holocene and their possible causes, is published by Dillon et al. (2021).

Ray-finned fishes

Ray-finned fish research
 Putative paraxial ossicle of a member of the family Molidae, possibly representing the first fossil find of the genus Mola from the Mediterranean Basin reported to date, is described from the Miocene Pietra Leccese Formation (Apulia, Italy) by Collareta et al. (2021).
 A platysomid specimen, representing the earliest deep-bodied actinopterygian reported to date, is described from the Carboniferous (Tournaisian) Horton Bluff Formation (Canada) by Wilson, Mansky & Anderson (2021), who evaluate the implications of this findings for the knowledge of the evolution of early ray-finned fishes.
 A review of the fossil record of Early–Middle Triassic marine bony fishes, aiming to determine the implications of poor fossil record from the late Olenekian-early middle Anisian interval on the knowledge of the Triassic radiation of bony fishes, is published by Romano (2021).
 A diverse assemblage of late Maastrichtian and Paleocene ray-finned fishes is described from Evrytania (Greece) by Argyriou & Davesne (2021).
 A study on the diversity of fishes from upper Paleocene microfossil localities in the Ravenscrag Formation (Saskatchewan, Canada) is published by Sinha et al. (2021).
 New fish fauna dating to the Paleocene–Eocene Thermal Maximum, indicating that diverse fish communities thrived in the paleotropics during this time period, is reported from Egypt by El-Sayed et al. (2021).
 Heingård et al. (2021) report preservation of residues of both internal and integumentary tissues in the form of dark organic stains in fossil fish larvae from the Eocene (Ypresian) Stolleklint Clay (Ølst Formation, Denmark).
 Revision of the fossil material of sturgeons from the Upper Miocene deposits of southern Ukraine is published by Hilton, Kovalchuk & Podoplelova (2021).
 A study on the morphological diversity and evolution of pycnodontiforms is published by Cawley et al. (2021).
 A study on fossil crushing dentitions of Pycnodus zeaformis and P. maliensis, providing evidence of a distinct pattern of gap-filling tooth addition in pycnodonts, with individual large teeth replaced by multiple small teeth, is published by Collins & Underwood (2021).
 A study on the histology of teeth and bones of Neoproscinetes penalvai and bones of Tepexichthys aranguthyorum is published by Meunier et al. (2021).
 A redescription of Atacamichthys greeni is published by Arratia et al. (2021), who interpret it as a stem-group teleost, and name the new family Atacamichthyidae.
 Revision of members of the clade Archaeomaenidae is published by Bean (2021), who considers Madariscus robustus to be a junior synonym of Archaeomaene tenuis.
 A study on genome size evolution in fossil stem-group teleosts (based on data from bone cell volumes in fossil specimens), aiming to determine the timing of whole-genome duplication in the evolutionary history of teleosts, is published by Davesne et al. (2021).
 New fossil material of elopomorphs, including the earliest records of members of the genera Albula and Paralbula from Gondwana reported to date and one of the earliest records of the genus Egertonia, is described from the Upper Cretaceous Mahajanga Basin (Madagascar) by Ostrowski (2021).
 A study on the evolutionary history of lanternfishes, primarily based on the fossil record of otoliths, is published by Schwarzhans & Carnevale (2021).
 Armbruster & Lujan (2021) identify Taubateia paraiba as a member of Rhinelepinae.

Lobe-finned fishes

Lobe-finned fish research
 A coelacanth specimen belonging or related to the species Heptanema paradoxum is described from the Ladinian Meride Limestone (Switzerland) by Renesto, Magnani & Stockar (2021), representing the first known coelacanth specimen from the Middle Triassic that undoubtedly bears elongate thin ribs.
 Fossil material of mawsoniid coelacanths is described from the marine Rhaetian Bonenburg locality (Germany) by Hartung et al. (2021), who interpret this finding as indicating that mawsoniids were already present in Europe in the Late Triassic, and that they inhabited marine environments at the end of the Triassic.
 Fossil material of a member of genus Mawsonia is described from the Cenomanian Woodbine Formation (Texas, United States; representing the first Cretaceous North American mawsoniid coelacanth reported to date) by Cavin et al. (2021), who evaluate the implications of this finding for the knowledge of potential factors that might have made long survival of the genera Mawsonia and Latimeria possible.
 An ossified lung of a mawsoniid coelacanth is described from the Maastrichtian of Oued Zem (Morocco) by Brito et al. (2021), representing the last known record of a Mesozoic coelacanth and the first known occurrence of coelacanths in the phosphate deposits of North Africa.
 A study on the evolution of feeding modes among tetrapodomorphs, as indicated by the anatomy of the skull of Tiktaalik roseae, is published by Lemberg, Daeschler & Shubin (2021), who report the simultaneous occurrence of anatomical modifications of the skull for prey capture through biting, as well as joint morphologies suggestive of cranial kinesis that is also present in suction-feeding fish.
 A study on the phylogenetic relationships of extant and fossil coelacanths is published by Toriño, Soto & Perea (2021).
 A study on the morphology and histology of the scales of Miguashaia bureaui, and on its implications for the knowledge of the evolution of the squamation in coelacanths, is published by Mondéjar-Fernández et al. (2021).
 New fossil remains representing one of the largest known coelacanths ever reported are described from the Middle Jurassic of Normandy (France) by Cavin et al. (2021), who also compare the relationship between taxic diversity and body size diversity in coelacanths and ray-finned fishes over the Devonian–Paleocene time interval.
 A study on tooth development in Powichthys thorsteinssoni, evaluating its implications for the knowledge of the evolution of the dentition of bony fishes, is published by King, Marone & Rücklin (2021).
 A study on the anatomy and phylogenetic relationships of Cladarosymblema narrienense is published by Clement et al. (2021).

General research
 A study on the morphology of the earliest osteocytes in Tremataspis mammillata and Bothriolepis trautscholdi is published by Haridy et al. (2021), who interpret their findings as indicating that the earliest known osteocytes in the fossil record had similar morphology and likely similar physiological capabilities to their modern counterparts, and attempt to determine initial driver favoring evolution of cellular (osteocytic) over acellular (anosteocytic) bones in vertebrates.
 Two Permian fish assemblages consisting of cartilaginous fishes and ray-finned fishes are reported from the Madumabisa Mudstone Formation (Zambia) by Peecook et al. (2021), who compare these assemblages with middle and late Permian freshwater fish faunas from Australia, Brazil, Chile and South Africa.
 A middle Miocene freshwater fish fossil fauna is described from the Castilletes Formation (Colombia) by Ballen et al. (2021), report the presence of members of fish groups known from extant Amazonian faunas east of the Andes but absent from faunas west of the Andes, and interpret their presence as evidence that the riverine systems of the Guajira Peninsula were connected to Amazonia during the middle Miocene.

References

2021 in paleontology